Anthony James Merrill Spencer (23 August 1929 — 26 January 2008) FRS was an applied mathematician whose main field of research was in understanding and predicting the mechanical behaviour of advanced materials.

Awards and honours
Spencer was elected a Fellow of the Royal Society (FRS) in 1987.

References

Fellows of the Royal Society
1929 births
2008 deaths
British mathematicians